Antonis Aresti is a former athlete and Paralympian from Cyprus who competed mainly in category T46 and T47 sprint events.

He competed in the 2008 Summer Paralympics in Beijing, China. There he won a silver medal in the men's 200 metres - T46 event and a silver medal in the men's 400 metres - T46 event

Career 

Born on 15 February 1983 in Limassol, Cyprus by Leonidas and Androula Aresti. At the age of three years, Aresti was dragged by a moving car while he was trying to cross the street. The accident caused a damage on his left hand. Such disability pushed the Cypriot sprinter to deal with sports.

He started practising athletics at early age by participating in school events mainly in long-distance races. At age 14 he started running seriously. Then, he won many medals in local youth championships in athletics. Also, he participated in world organisations as a member of the national team of Cyprus.

He studied Physical Education at National Sports Academy (NSA) of Bulgaria in Sofia and graduated in 2008.
His coach is Efthymios Kyprianou.

World and European Championships 

Aresti's first big worldwide success occurred during his participation at the Athletics World Championship for athletes with disabilities in Assen, Netherlands in 2006, where he won the bronze medal in the men's 400 meters category T46.
The second worldwide success of the Cypriot runner, occurred in 2007 during his participation at the Athletics World Championships organised by the International Wheelchair and Amputee Sports Federation (IWAS) in Taipei, Taiwan where he won the silver medal in the men's 200 meters category T46.

In January 2011, Aresti participated in the Athletics World Championship for athletes with disabilities in Christchurch of New Zealand. He won two gold medals at the finals of the events: Men's 200 meters category T46 and Men's 400 meters category T46 with times of 22.25 seconds and 49.44 seconds respectively.

Additionally, the Cypriot champion athlete conquered three more medals in the 2012 European Championships organised by the International Paralympic Committee in June 2012 in Stadskanaal. Specifically, he won the gold medal in men's 400 meters category T46 with a time of 50.55 seconds, the gold in the men's 200 meters category T46 with a time of 22.58 seconds and a silver medal in men's 100 meters category T46 with a time of 11.36 seconds.

After three years of absence from the land of the track due to injuries, Aresti returns to world athletic events in 2015. In June 2015, Aresti participated in the Hellenic Championship for Disabled Athletes and secured the limit for his participation in the Athletics World Championship for athletes with disabilities organized in Doha, Qatar in October 2015 by the International Paralympic Committee in category T47.

In June 2016, the Cypriot champion athlete participated in 2016 European Championships organised by the International Paralympic Committee in Grosseto, Italy. Aresti won his 4th medal in European level.

Participation in Paralympic Games 

Aresti participated at the 13th Summer Paralympic Games held in Beijing in September 2008. His participation was a great moment for both his career and the history of Cypriot sport since he managed to win two silver medals in the Men's 200m T46 and Men's 400m T46 with times of 22.15 seconds  and 48.87 seconds  respectively.

During the 14th Summer Paralympic Games held in London in 2012, the Cypriot sprinter participated and finished fourth in the finals of men's 200m category T46 and men's 400m category T46 with times 22.40 seconds  and 49.59 seconds  respectively. Also, he participated in the men's 100m race category T46 with time 11.36  but did not qualify for the final race of the event.

Aresti secured participation in the 15th Summer Paralympic Games to be held in Rio de Janeiro in September 2016.

Personal Bests

Other Participation

References

External links 
 

1984 births
Living people
Sportspeople from Limassol
Cypriot male sprinters
Athletes (track and field) at the 2008 Summer Paralympics
Athletes (track and field) at the 2012 Summer Paralympics
Paralympic silver medalists for Cyprus
Paralympic athletes of Cyprus
Paralympic medalists in athletics (track and field)
Medalists at the World Para Athletics Championships
Medalists at the World Para Athletics European Championships
Medalists at the 2008 Summer Paralympics
Paralympic sprinters